Bradford S. Lander (born July 8, 1969) is an American politician, urban planner, and community organizer who currently serves as the New York City Comptroller. A member of the Democratic Party, Lander is a progressive politician, and has been described as "one of the most left-leaning politicians in the city."

Lander was first elected to the City Council in 2009, later serving as the Deputy Leader for Policy. His district included portions of Brooklyn: Boerum Hill, Borough Park, Brooklyn Heights, Carroll Gardens, Cobble Hill, Flatbush, Gowanus, Green-Wood Cemetery, Kensington, Park Slope, Prospect Heights, Prospect Lefferts Gardens, Red Hook, Prospect Park, South Slope, Sunset Park, and Windsor Terrace.

In 2021, Lander was elected as the 45th city's comptroller, and assumed office on January 1, 2022. He was notably endorsed by "some of the nation's most prominent progressives, including Representative Alexandria Ocasio-Cortez of New York and Senator Elizabeth Warren of Massachusetts."

Early life and education
Lander is a Missouri native, and son of Carole Lander and David Lander, a bankruptcy attorney. He grew up in the Creve Coeur suburb of St. Louis in a Reform Jewish family. He earned a bachelor's degree from the University of Chicago in 1991, where he received a Harry S. Truman Scholarship, and master's degrees in anthropology from University College London on a Marshall Scholarship and in urban planning from the Pratt Institute.

Career
From 1993 to 2003, Lander was the executive director of the Fifth Avenue Committee (FAC), a Park Slope not-for-profit organization that develops and manages affordable housing. For his work he received the 2000 New York Magazine Civics Award, and FAC received the 2002 Leadership for a Changing World award (sponsored by the Washington, D.C.-based Institute for Sustainable Communities).

From 2003 to 2009, Lander was a director of the university-based Pratt Center for Community Development. In that position, he was a critic of the Bloomberg administration's development policies. He has also been a critic of the Atlantic Yards project. Lander's work in 2003–2005 on Greenpoint-Williamsburg rezoning led to the first New York City inclusionary housing program to create affordable housing in new development outside Manhattan. Lander served on a mayoral taskforce that recommended reforms to the 421-a tax exemption for luxury housing and required that new development in certain areas of the city set aside affordable housing units. He co-led the completion of the One City One Future platform, a progressive vision for economic development in New York City. He stepped down as head of the organization in 2009 to seek a seat on the New York City Council. Lander teaches as an adjunct professor at Brooklyn Law School.

Politico described Lander as "one of the most left-leaning politicians in the city."

New York City Council

Lander is a co-founder of the Progressive Caucus in the New York City Council, a group that was described by The New York Times as "the City Council's most liberal members." For his first term, Lander shared the title of Co-Chair of the caucus with his Manhattan colleague Speaker Melissa Mark-Viverito.

Lander was one of four Council members who brought participatory budgeting to New York City, which allows citizens to propose, develop, and vote on items in the municipal budget. Over half of the 51 New York City Council Districts now engage in participatory budgeting.

2009–2017 
Lander was first elected to New York City Council office on the Democratic Party and Working Families Party lines on November 4, 2009, with 70% of the vote. Lander had won a hotly contested Democratic primary on September 15, 2009 with 41% of the vote in a field of five. Lander was reelected on the Democratic and Working Families Parties' lines in 2013 to serve for a second term.

In 2013, Lander played a key role in a campaign to pass paid sick leave over Mayor Bloomberg's veto, telling the Brooklyn Reporter the legislation would “make our city a fairer, more compassionate place to live and work.” Lander passed the Independent Expenditure Disclosure Act, giving NYC the most aggressive SuperPAC disclosure requirements in the country. In 2015, Lander passed legislation to ban discriminatory employment credit checks, ending the practice of companies discriminating against people because of their credit history.
In March 2015, Lander was arrested for blocking traffic in Park Slope to show support for eight striking car washers, outside a car wash that was closed at the time; it was his fourth arrest. The Wall Street Journal covered his arrest with an article entitled: "Please Don't Arrest Me—Until the Cameras Are Here". In November 2016 he announced his intention to get arrested, saying it was: "part of a long tradition of civil disobedience, and it takes a little courage." In December 2017 he was arrested inside the Capitol Building in Washington DC as he was protesting a tax bill and refusing the request of police to move the protest from public spaces; he tweeted "Being arrested ... in the halls of Congress while ... fighting for a country where we provide health care for those who need it ... is something I'll remember for the rest of my life". In June 2018 he was arrested for blocking traffic, disorderly conduct, and failing to disperse at a protest outside the office of State Senator Martin Golden.

In May 2016, Lander upset Asian community groups by calling supporters of Chinese-American Yungman Lee (a challenger of Representative Nydia Velázquez) "scumbags." Asian groups called his comment racist, and rallied at City Hall to denounce it. Lee said Lander's comments were disrespectful, and his choice of words was especially distasteful, adding: "In my view it's over the top of what should be part of our political discourse... we shouldn't have language like that in our politics." Lee demanded an apology, but Lander refused.

Lander opposed rezoning the site of Long Island College Hospital to include affordable housing. As of July 2017, he was the primary sponsor of 20 local laws enacted by the City Council and signed by the Mayor. In addition, Lander played a role in helping shepherd the Community Safety Act to passage, with Council member Jumaane Williams. In 2017, Lander worked with advocates at the Association of Neighborhood and Housing Development and Make the Road New York to create a Certificate of No Harassment program that provides the strongest protections against tenant harassment & displacement of any law in the country. Lander also led the campaign that secured air-conditioning in all NYC school classrooms, shining a spotlight on the fact that 25 percent of classrooms previously did not have A/C, as part of the #TooHotToLearn campaign.

Lander has crafted a number of workers’ rights policies. In 2017, Lander passed legislation to win a fair work week for fast-food and retail workers. He also worked with the Freelancers Union to create the “Freelance Isn't Free Act,” the first legislation of its kind to ensure that freelancers and independent contractors are paid on time and in full. In 2018, Lander won the first rule in the country to guarantee a living wage for Uber, Lyft and other for-hire drivers. By April 2020, Lander had sponsored over 2,254 article of legislation. City and State New York ranked the performance of Lander in the lower half of NYC lawmakers, ranking him 30th out of the 51 councilmembers, on the criteria of the number of bills introduced, the number of bills signed into law, attendance, and responsiveness to questions from constituents and from the media.

2018–2019 
In November 2018, Democratic Assemblymember Dov Hikind urged Lander to speak out against Lander's friend pro-Palestinian activist Linda Sarsour, for what Hikind described as her anti-Semitic views, criticisms of Israel, and reluctance to denounce Nation of Islam Minister Louis Farrakhan, and "Show us that the progressive movement is not a safe haven for haters." Lander had defended Sarsour the year prior when some urged that she not be allowed to be the commencement speaker at the City University of New York's Graduate School of Public Health. In 2020 he said he had: "traveled to the West Bank to get a glimpse of the horrors of life under occupation and the struggle against it."

Starting in 2019, Lander has drawn criticism and, in his words, "anger" and "suspicion" for vocally supporting contracts for two homeless shelters in particular. He did this despite multiple press reports that those contracts contain up to $89 million of unexplained cost compared to contracts for equivalent shelters, and that there is no apparent explanation for the increased cost, which neighbors said was $10,557 per unit per month. Lander acknowledged that the contracts will benefit developers accused of wrongdoing in the past.

In 2019 Lander admitted to an ethics violation for using his official government position to solicit monetary donations for a progressive non-profit he helped to create, and of which he was Chairman. Lander chairs the Council's Committee on Rules, Privileges and Ethics. In his second term on the Council, Lander served as the deputy leader for policy.

2020–present
In March 2020, as the COVID-19 pandemic began, Lander urged that the police suspend criminal arrests, summonses, warrant enforcement, and parole violations for low-level offenses, and release most of the over 900 people incarcerated at Rikers Island who were over 50 years old.

Starting in 2020, Lander has been a leading advocate of a program that has moved over 9,500 homeless people (Lander's goal is 30,000 homeless) to vacant hotel rooms across New York City to provide space for social distancing during the coronavirus pandemic, at an average cost of $174 per room per night (or $5,293 per person per month). The proposal drew intense criticism from New York Mayor Bill de Blasio's New York City Department of Social Services, which called it "ham-fisted and reckless, self-defeatingly unilateral and ill-informed, and legally questionable and amateurish: insisting on using a one-size fits all approach for a system that is anything but, and forcing the involuntary rushed transfer of more than ten thousand people into hotels without appropriate services to match, putting individuals with higher service needs, including substance use challenges, at risk in the process." Lander called DSS's concerns "cartoonish insults." The program has also drawn strong reactions from neighborhood residents, with some residents saying the program has led to significant increases in crime, nonstop open drug sales and drug use, public sex acts, and rampant street harassment of women and girls, and worrying about the risk of having sex offenders housed 1-block from a public school; other residents have been more open to the program.

Lander voiced support for defunding the police and limiting police powers by cutting their budget by $1 billion in 2020. In June 2020, Lander announced: "It is time to defund the police". In December he called for the disbandment of the New York City Police Department Vice Unit, and decriminalizing prostitution.

Lander said in December 2020 that it was a core ideal of his to "comfort the afflicted, and afflict the comfortable."

In January 2021 he said: "As a white man, [the work of racial justice] starts by listening as honestly as I can to Black people about the anger and pain they are feeling, and the system of white supremacy and systemic racism it reflects. That is not easy -- because it implicates me...." He supports removing the statue of Christopher Columbus from Columbus Circle in Manhattan.

In March 2022, Comptroller Lander disagreed with Mayor Eric Adams' new Medicare program for New York City employees and city retirees. Lander says the program is unnecessary and as comptroller he (Lander) can use his authority to prevent the contracts from being implemented.

2021 comptroller campaign

Facing term limits for his council seat after his second term, Lander announced his candidacy for the 2021 New York City Comptroller election, an open race as the incumbent, Scott Stringer, faced term limits. He ran in the Democratic primary against among others NY State Senator Brian Benjamin, entrepreneur and former US Marine Zach Iscol, NY State Senator Kevin Parker, former Public Advocate and former New York City Council Speaker Corey Johnson and NY Assemblymember David Weprin.

Lander said that if elected he would expand the office to conduct equity audits to reduce disparities across race, gender, and ethnicity, including in how city agencies hire contractors. He said he would also use the office as an organizing vehicle for advocates, and produce audits, draft reports, and release data in partnership with organizers running campaigns centered on racial, social, and economic justice. Lander received endorsements from the Working Families Party, unions including Communications Workers of America District 1, and various Democratic clubs and community organizations. He was endorsed by elected officials including NYC Public Advocate Jumaane Williams, Congresswoman Nydia Velázquez, Congresswoman Alexandria Ocasio-Cortez, and members of the New York City Council and New York State legislature.

Candidates who raise at least $125,000 from at least 500 donors qualify for matching city funds from the New York City Campaign Finance Board, on an 8-to-1 match basis. As of February 16, 2021, he was one of three candidates who had qualified for matching funds, along with Brian Benjamin and Zach Iscol.

Lander defeated Corey Johnson in the Democratic primary for comptroller and won the general election over Republican candidate Daby Carreras.

Election history

Personal life
Lander lives in Brooklyn with his wife, Meg Barnette, a former executive at Planned Parenthood, now President of Nonprofit New York. He also served as the Housing Chair of Brooklyn Community Board 6, served on the board of directors of the Jewish Funds for Justice, and is a little league coach in the 78th Precinct Youth Council.

Lander joined the Democratic Socialists of America in 1987 when he was a student at the University of Chicago.

References

External links
Official New York City Comptroller Website

1969 births
20th-century American Jews
21st-century American Jews
21st-century American politicians
Alumni of University College London
American urban planners
Brooklyn Law School faculty
Jewish American people in New York (state) politics
Living people
Democratic Socialists of America politicians from New York
New York (state) Democrats
New York City Council members
Politicians from Brooklyn
Pratt Institute alumni
University of Chicago alumni